Down Home Sessions IV is the fourth EP from American country music artist Cole Swindell.  The work was released on 24 November 2017 by Warner Bros.

Content
In late 2017, Swindell published a music video for "Beer in the Headlights", a song originally recorded by Luke Bryan on his 2013 album Crash My Party, and Swindell's rendition of Bryan's collaboration with Florida Georgia Line, "This Is How We Roll", which he co-wrote. In addition to those two songs, Down Home Sessions IV features Swindell's renditions of three other songs that he wrote for other artists: "Roller Coaster", also cut by Bryan; "Outta My Head", recorded by Craig Campbell; and "Get Me Some of That", recorded by Thomas Rhett.

Critical reception 
Markos Papadatos of Digital Journal stated that Swindell's 'cover of "This is How We Roll" is infectious, and it would make country duo Florida Georgia Line proud', giving it 4.5 out of 5 stars.  Cillea Houghton of Sounds Like Nashville stated that the musician "presents the songs in the stripped down, acoustic fashion they were created in".

Track listing

Personnel
Adam Cunningham - bass guitar
Joel Hutsell - acoustic guitar, background vocals
Scotty Sanders - dobro, pedal steel guitar

Chris Marquart - drums, percussion
Clint May - acoustic guitar, background vocals
Josh Schultz - organ, piano, Wurlitzer, background vocals

Cole Swindell - lead vocals

References 

2017 EPs
Cole Swindell EPs
Warner Records EPs